The 2010–11 Liga Bet season saw Maccabi Sektzia Ma'alot-Tarshiha (champions of the North A division), Maccabi Daliyat al-Karmel (champions of the North B division), Beitar Kfar Saba (champions of the South A division) and Hapoel Katamon Jerusalem (champions of the South B division) winning the title and promotion to Liga Alef.

The clubs ranked 2nd to 5th in each division entered a promotion play-off, at the end of which, in the North section F.C. Givat Olga won against Ironi Sayid Umm al-Fahm from Liga Alef North and, while in the South section, Ortodoxim Lod won against Hapoel Nahlat Yehuda from Liga Alef South. Both club were promoted to Liga Alef.

At the bottom, Hapoel Oranit (from South A division) finished bottom of its division and was automatically relegated to Liga Gimel. Maccabi Kafr Sumei (from North A division), Bnei Jisr az-Zarqa (from North B division) and Ironi Ramla (from South B division) were expelled from the league during the season and had their results nullified.

The clubs ranked 12th to 15th in each division entered a relegation play-off, at the end of which Hapoel Nahariya (from North A division), Hapoel Ar'ara (from North B division), Beitar Petah Tikva (from South A division) and Beitar Giv'at Ze'ev (from South B division) dropped to Liga Gimel as well.

North A Division

Maccabi Kafr Sumei was dismissed from the league and its results were nullified.

North B Division

Bnei Jisr az-Zarqa was dismissed from the league and its results were nullified.

South A Division

South B Division

Ironi Ramla was dismissed from the league and its results were nullified.

Promotion play-offs

North divisions

North A division

Semi-finals

Bnei Kabul and F.C. Ahva Kafr Manda advanced to the North A division promotion play-offs final.

Final

Bnei Kabul advanced to the North regional final.

North B division

Semi-finals

F.C. Givat Olga and Hapoel Migdal HaEmek advanced to the North B division promotion play-offs final.

Final

F.C. Givat Olga advanced to the North regional final.

North Regional final

F.C. Givat Olga advanced to the promotion play-off match against Ironi Sayid Umm al-Fahm from Liga Alef.

Promotion play-off Match

F.C. Givat Olga promoted to Liga Alef; Ironi Sayid Umm al-Fahm relegated to Liga Bet.

South divisions

South A division

Semi-finals

Hapoel Mahane Yehuda and F.C. Kafr Kasim advanced to the South A division promotion play-offs final.

Final

Hapoel Mahane Yehuda advanced to the South regional final.

South B division

Semi-finals

Maccabi Sha'arayim and Ortodoxim Lod advanced to the South B division promotion play-offs final.

Final

Ortodoxim Lod advanced to the South Regional final.

South Regional final

Ortodoxim Lod advanced to the promotion play-off match against Hapoel Nahlat Yehuda from Liga Alef.

Promotion play-off Match

Ortodoxim Lod promoted to Liga Alef; Hapoel Nahlat Yehuda relegated to Liga Bet.

Relegation play-offs

North A division

Semi-finals

Hapoel Bnei Jadeidi and Beitar Nahariya remained in Liga Bet. Ihud Bnei Majd al-Krum and Hapoel Nahariya qualified for the North A division relegation play-off final.

Final

Ihud Bnei Majd al-Krum remained in Liga Bet. Hapoel Nahariya relegated to Liga Gimel.

North B division

Semi-finals

Hapoel Iksal and Maccabi Or Akiva remained in Liga Bet. Maccabi Tirat HaCarmel and Hapoel Ar'ara qualified for the North B division relegation play-off final.

Final

Maccabi Tirat HaCarmel remained in Liga Bet. Hapoel Ar'ara relegated to Liga Gimel.

South A division

Semi-finals

Shikun Vatikim Ramat Gan and Hapoel Pardesiya remained in Liga Bet. Beitar Petah Tikva and Beitar Ramat Gan qualified for the South A division relegation play-off final.

Final

Beitar Ramat Gan remained in Liga Bet. Beitar Petah Tikva relegated to Liga Gimel.

South B division

Semi-finals

Hapoel Mevaseret Zion and F.C. Kiryat Gat remained in Liga Bet. F.C. Dimona and Beitar Giv'at Zeev qualified for the South B division relegation play-off final.

Final

F.C. Dimona remained in Liga Bet. Beitar Giv'at Zeev relegated to Liga Gimel.

References
 The Israel Football Association 
 The Israel Football Association 
 The Israel Football Association 
 The Israel Football Association 

Liga Bet seasons
4
Israel